Gwendolyn Zepeda (born December 27, 1971 in Houston, Texas) is an American author. Zepeda is Houston's first Poet Laureate, serving a two-year term from 2013 to 2015. She was succeeded by Leslie Contreras Schwartz.

History
Her father was Mexican American and her mother was a White American of German, Scottish, and Welsh ancestry. She attended Dow and Roosevelt elementary schools, Hamilton Middle School, Reagan High School (now Heights High School), and the High School for Performing and Visual Arts (HSPVA). She subsequently attended the University of Texas at Austin.

In June 1997, Zepeda started an online journal called Gwen's Trailer Trash Page. It eventually evolved into Gwen's Petty, Judgmental, Evil Thoughts. She is notable as one of the first bloggers to write and sell a book, and also as a Latina author and the first Latina blogger.

Writing 
Her first book, To the Last Man I Slept with and All the Jerks Just Like Him, was a short story collection published by Arte Publico Press in 2004.

Her first novel, Houston, We Have a Problema is a chick lit novel and was published by Grand Central Publishing January 2009.

Her first picture book, Growing Up with Tamales, was published by Piñata Books, an imprint of Arte Publico Press, in May 2008. It is a 2009 Charlotte Zolotow Highly Commended Title and was nominated for a Tejas Star Award.

Piñata Books published her second picture book, Sunflowers, in May 2009.
 
Zepeda was one of the founding members of Television Without Pity. She recapped the television shows Ally McBeal and 7th Heaven from 1999 to 2001 under the name Gwen.

She blogged for the Houston Chronicle in 2009 and 2010.

Bibliography 
 To the Last Man I Slept with and All the Jerks Just Like Him. Houston, Texas : Arte Publico Press, 2004.
 Growing Up with Tamales. Houston, Texas : Arte Publico Press, 2008.
 Houston, We Have a Problema. New York : Grand Central Publishing, 2009.
 Sunflowers. Houston, Texas : Arte Publico Press, 2009.
 Lone Star Legend. New York : Grand Central Publishing, 2010.
 I Kick the Ball. Houston, Texas : Arte Publico Press, 2010.
 Better With You Here. New York : Grand Central Publishing, 2012.
 Level Up. Houston, Texas : Arte Publico Press, 2012.
 Falling in Love with Fellow Prisoners: Poems. Houston, Texas : Arte Publico Press, 2013.
 Monsters, Zombies and Addicts: Poems. Houston, Texas : Arte Publico Press, 2015.
 Maya and Annie on Saturdays and Sundays. Houston, Texas : Arte Publico Press, 2018.
 Houston Noir. New York : Akashic Books, 2019.

See also
 History of Mexican Americans in Houston

References 

 Velan, Kemila " Blog, blog, blog, Latinos lift the conversation".
 Mellen, Kim "Diva of the Doublewide" "Austin Chronicle," August 4, 2000.
 Kolker, Claudia "Quinceaneras come in new flavors now'," "The Latina Voz"
 Nuestra Palabra "National Sor Juana Festival: A Tribute to Mexican Women" Presentation at Museum of Fine Arts Houston, March 22–April 29, 2007
 Martin, Betty L. "Houston artists inspired by MECA to perform at 30th anniversary event" "Houston Chronicle" September 14, 2007
 Ruiz, Loida "Skirt! profile: Gwendolyn Zepeda". January 1, 2009
 Cooperative Children's Book Center, School of Education, University of Wisconsin-Madison "Charlotte Zolotow Award Books".  January 28, 2009

External links 
 
 "Houston appoints its own poet laureate." 
 Author Gwendolyn Zepeda speaks at Houston Community College (2007 podcast reading)
 Zepeda, Gwendolyn "The Quinceañera I Was Too Poor to Have". "The Latina Voz"
 Zepeda, Gwendolyn "Car Wash" recap on Television Without Pity
 Zepeda, Gwendolyn Interview with Eric Ladau of KUHF.
 

1971 births
American women novelists
American chick lit writers
Hispanic and Latino American novelists
People from Houston
Novelists from Texas
American writers of Mexican descent
American women short story writers
20th-century American novelists
Living people
20th-century American women writers
20th-century American short story writers
21st-century American women
Municipal Poets Laureate in the United States